|}

The November Handicap is a flat handicap horse race in Great Britain open to horses aged three years or older. It is run at Doncaster over a distance of 1 mile 3 furlongs and 197 yards (2,393 metres), and it is scheduled to take place each year in early November.

History
The event was originally held at the New Barns, Manchester, where it was called the Manchester November Handicap. It was established in 1876, and was initially run over 1 mile and 4 furlongs before contested over 1 mile and 6 furlongs in 1880. It was cut to its present length in 1902 when the race was re-located to the Castle Irwell course.

The race was staged at Pontefract from 1942 to 1945. It returned to Manchester in 1946, and continued there until the venue closed in 1963.

The event was transferred to Doncaster in 1964, and from this point it was known as the Manchester Handicap. For a period it took place in October, on the same day as the Observer Gold Cup. It was rescheduled for November and given its current title in 1976.

The November Handicap is now run on the last day of Britain's turf flat racing season.

Records
Most successful horse:
 no horse has won this race more than once

Leading jockey (3 wins):
 Steve Donoghue – Ultimus (1911), Old Orkney (1927), Saracen (1928)
 Billy Nevett – Newton Ford (1936), Beinn Dearg (1940), Good Taste (1951)
 Joe Mercer – Paul Jones (1958), Misty Light (1971), Bold Rex (1985)
 Willie Carson – King Top (1972), Azzaam (1990), Hieroglyphic (1991)

Leading trainer (6 wins):
 John Gosden – Hieroglyphic (1991), Turgenev (1992), Sabadilla (1997), Charm School (2009), Zuider Zee (2011), Royal Line (2018)

Winners since 1980
 Weights given in stones and pounds.

Earlier winners

 1876: Polonaise
 1877: Hopbloom
 1878: Belphoebe
 1879: Mars
 1880: Madame du Barry
 1881: Gladstone
 1882: Boswell
 1883: Corrie Roy
 1884: Keir
 1885: Raffaello
 1886: Stourhead
 1887: Carlton
 1888: Claymore
 1889: Fallow Chat
 1890: Parlington
 1891: Lily of Lumley
 1892: Paddy
 1893: Golden Drop
 1894: Ravensbury
 1895: Ivor
 1896: Telescope
 1897: Asterie
 1898: Chaleureux
 1899: Proclamation
 1900: Lexicon
 1901: Carabine
 1902: St Maclou
 1903: Switch Cap
 1904: no race
 1905: Ferment
 1906: Spate
 1907: Baltinglass
 1908: Old China
 1909: Admiral Togo III
 1910: The Valet
 1911: Ultimus
 1912: Wagstaff
 1913: Dalmatian
 1914: Wardha
 1915–16: no race
 1917: Planet
 1918: no race
 1919: King John
 1920: Pomme de Terre
 1921: Blue Dun
 1922: Torelore
 1923: no race
 1924: Cloudbank
 1925–26: no race
 1927: Old Orkney
 1928: Saracen
 1929: Promptitude
 1930: Glorious Devon
 1931: North Drift
 1932: Hypostyle
 1933: Jean's Dream
 1934: Pip Emma
 1935: Free Fare
 1936: Newton Ford
 1937: Solitaire
 1938: Pappageno
 1939: Tutor
 1940: Beinn Dearg
 1941: Crown Colony
 1942: Golden Boy
 1943: Mad Carew
 1944: Kerry Piper
 1945: Oatflake
 1946: Las Vegas
 1947: Regret
 1948: Sports Master
 1949: Fidonia
 1950: Coltbridge
 1951: Good Taste
 1952: Summer Rain
 1953: Torch Singer
 1954: no race
 1955: Tearaway
 1956: Trentham Boy
 1957: Chief Barker
 1958: Paul Jones
 1959: Operatic Society
 1960: Dalnamein
 1961: Henry's Choice
 1962: Damredub
 1963: Best Song
 1964: Osier
 1965: Concealdem
 1966: Polish Warrior
 1967: Bugle Boy
 1968: Zardia
 1969: Tintagel II
 1970: Saraceno
 1971: Misty Light
 1972: King Top
 1973: Only for Jo
 1974: Gritti Palace
 1975: Mr Bigmore
 1976: Gale Bridge
 1977: Sailcloth
 1978: Eastern Spring
 1979: Morse Code

See also
 Horse racing in Great Britain
 List of British flat horse races
 Recurring sporting events established in 1876 – this race is included under its original title, Manchester November Handicap.

References

 Paris-Turf: 
 Racing Post
 galopp-sieger.de – November Handicap (ex Manchester November Handicap).
 pedigreequery.com – November Handicap – Doncaster.
 

Flat races in Great Britain
Doncaster Racecourse
Open middle distance horse races

1876 establishments in England